Sovetsky Urban Settlement or Sovetskoye Urban Settlement is the name of several municipal formations in Russia.
Sovetsky Urban Settlement, a municipal formation which the town of Sovetsky in Sovetsky District of Khanty-Mansi Autonomous Okrug is incorporated as
Sovetsky Urban Settlement, a municipal formation which the Urban-Type Settlement of Sovetsky in Sovetsky District of the Mari El Republic is incorporated as
Sovetskoye Urban Settlement, a municipal formation which the Town of Sovetsk in Sovetsky District of Kirov Oblast is incorporated as
Sovetskoye Urban Settlement, a municipal formation corresponding to Sovetskoye Settlement Municipal Formation, an administrative division of Vyborgsky District of Leningrad Oblast
Sovetskoye Urban Settlement, a municipal formation the work settlement of Sovetskoye in Sovetsky District of Saratov Oblast is incorporated as

See also
Sovetsky (disambiguation)
Sovetsk Urban Settlement, a municipal formation which Sovetsk Town Under District Jurisdiction in Shchyokinsky District of Tula Oblast is incorporated as

References

Notes

Sources

